The 2016–17 Jakarta protests, branded Aksi Bela Islam (Action for Defending Islam) by the protesters, are series of Islamist uprisings and protests against Governor of Jakarta Basuki Tjahaja Purnama, who was accused of committing blasphemy of the Quran. The protests were carried out by the Islamic Defenders Front alongside its Islamist collaborators which make up a single coalition called the 212 Movement, named after their third protest, held in 2 December 2016. 

Five protests were held, all were close to the 2017 Jakarta gubernatorial election:
 October 2016 Jakarta protests on 14 October
 November 2016 Jakarta protests on 24 November
 December 2016 Jakarta protests on 2 December
 February 2017 Jakarta protests on 11 and 21 February
 March 2017 Jakarta protests on 31 March

References

Far-right politics in Asia
Protests in Indonesia
History of Islam in Indonesia